Vegam is a Tamil film released in 2007. It is an unofficial remake of the English movie Cellular
 It was remade again in Tamil as Nayagan.

Plot

The movie revolves around Ashwin (Ashwin Shekar) who runs an event management company, and romances Archana (Veda). Aswin comes to Malaysia to meet her. He comes across a telephone call from a woman, who cries out for help.

A former cop Sriman kidnaps a housewife Selvi (Khushboo) and her son and asks for a tape. Selvi does not know anything about the tape Sriman is asking about. To ensure that Selvi does not make any outside contacts from his place, he breaks the receiver of the telephone. Selvi somehow repairs it and dials an anonymous number which is answered by Aswin and Selvi pleads with him to save her life, and her sons. Aswin takes the conversation as light initially but later on when the calls keep repeating, he realises the issue and sets in search of Selvi to rescue her.

He eventually acquired the assistance of a local cop, Prabhu Ganesan in his quest.

How did Aswin rescue Selvi and her son from sriman and his gang is the rest of the story. This story is a remake from the Hollywood movie, "Cellular", starring Chris Evans, Kim Basinger and Jason Statham.

Cast
Ashwin Shekhar as Ashwin
Veda as Archana
Prabhu as Kumaravel, ASP, Malaysia Police
Khushbu Sundar as Selvi
Sriman as Cop
Lollu Sabha Jeeva as Ashwin's friend
Mohan Vaidya as Ashwin's father
S. Ve. Shekhar cameo appearance
Venu Aravind
Crane Manohar
Sridhar

Soundtrack
Veena exponent Rajesh Vaidhya made his debut as composer with this film.
"Aarumugam" — Rajesh Vaidya
"Kalathara" – P. Unnikrishnan, Anuradha Sekhar
"Silirkudhe" — Anuradha Sekhar
"Kya Bole" — Tippu, Harini
"Vegam" — Ranjith, Haricharan

Reception
The film received negative reviews from critics.Behindwoods wrote "Director K R Udayshankar should have worked harder. There are absolutely no elements in the film to create an impact on the audience mind." Balaji of Thiraipadam wrote "Not only is Ashwin completely unsuited to play the hero, the film, a combination of a bad romance and weak action ripped off from Cellular, provides nothing to make Ashwin more tolerable."

References

Indian thriller films
2007 films
2000s Tamil-language films
Indian remakes of American films
2007 thriller films